Jeanneau is a French boatyard in Les Herbiers, in the Vendée département, which has produced yachts since 1957. It was founded by Henri Jeanneau, a hardware store owner, who began by producing power boats.

Jeanneau specializes in monohulls, but it created a specialist multihull line, Lagoon catamarans. Jeanneau (and Lagoon) became part of Groupe Beneteau in 1995.

History
Henri Jeanneau's first boats in 1957 were wooden outboard motor-powered dinghy designs. He quickly moved to producing boats from fiberglass and by 1960 his motorboats, including the Jeanneau Sea-bird, were made from this new material, followed by the first sailboats in 1964.

In 1970 the company was purchased by the American conglomerate, Bangor Punta. By mid-1980 the company was sold again and became part of Chatellier SA. In 1990 there was a joint venture with Italian Ferretti Craft to build a series of yachts, but the project did not last long. In 1995 the company was bought out by Groupe Beneteau and became part of the largest global sailboat-building enterprise.

In the mid-1990s some Jeanneau designs were built in Polish boat yards, including the Sun Odyssey 24.1. In 2001 Ostroda Yachts of Poland became part of Jeanneau.

The Jeanneau Advanced Technologies division was set up to build custom projects, such as the trimarans for the film Waterworld and some Americas Cup designs.

Boats

Designs built by the company include:

References

External links 

A summary of Jeanneau History 1957-2017

Vendée
Jeanneau